This is a list of Indian Bengali language films that are scheduled to release in 2023.

January – March

April – June

July – September

October – December

See also
 List of Indian Bengali films of 2021
 List of Indian Bengali films of 2022

References

External links
 Upcoming Bengali Films

Bengali
2023

Indian Bengali